Markus Freiberger (born 19 December 1995) is an Austrian racing cyclist, who currently rides for UCI Continental team .

Major results
2015
 1st  Mountains classification Tour of China II
2016
 3rd GP Izola
 3rd Grand Prix Südkärnten
2017
 National Road Championships
1st  Under-23 time trial
5th Time trial
 7th Time trial, UEC European Under-23 Road Championships
2018
 5th Overall Tour de Taiwan

References

External links

1995 births
Living people
Austrian male cyclists
Place of birth missing (living people)